For historical/ mythological figure in Bengal, see Adi Sura

Adisura is a genus of moths of the family Noctuidae. Species are found thoroughout India and Sri Lanka, Africa and some far East Asian countries. Differs from Pyrrhia species in having sparsely spined mid and hind tibia and thorax without sharp crest.

Species
 Adisura aerugo (Felder and Rogenhofer, 1874)
 Adisura affinis Rothschild, 1921
 Adisura atkinsoni Moore, 1881
 Adisura bella Gaede, 1915
 Adisura callima Bethune-Baker, 1911
 Adisura goateri Hacker & Saldaitis, 2011
 Adisura litarga (Turner, 1920)
 Adisura malagassica Rothschild, 1924
 Adisura marginalis (Walker, 1858)
 Adisura straminea Hampson, 1902

References

 
 

Heliothinae
Noctuoidea genera